Pseudocerastes is a genus of vipers endemic to the Middle East and Asia. It was originally created as a monotypic genus in 1896 by Boulenger for the species Pseudocerastes persicus, but three species are now recognised: the spider-tailed horned viper (P. urarachnoides); Persian horned viper (P. persicus) and Field's horned viper (P.  fieldi). Like all other vipers, the members of this genus are venomous.

Pseudocerastes are often referred to as false-horned vipers because of the horn-like structures above their eyes that are made up of numerous small scales. This is in contrast to the "true" horned viper, Cerastes cerastes, which has similar supraorbital "horns", each consisting of a single elongated scale.

Taxonomy
In 2006, Bostanchi, Anderson, Kami and Papenfuss described a new species: P. urarachnoides. It is found in the Zagros Mountains of western Iran and is described as having the most elaborate tail ornamentation of any snake yet described, save for the rattlesnakes, Crotalus and Sistrurus.

P. fieldi and P. persicus were once regarded as two subspecies of the same species, but further studies on the snakes'  morphology, molecular structure and toxicology determined that they are in fact separate species.

Species

References

Further reading

Boulenger GA (1896). Catalogue of the Snakes in the British Museum (Natural History). Volume III., Containing the ... Viperidæ. London: Trustees of the British Museum (Natural History). (Taylor and Francis, printers). xiv + 727 pp. + Plates I.- XXV. (Genus Pseudocerastes and species Pseudocerastes persicus, p. 501).
Duméril A-M-C, Bibron G, Duméril A[HA] (1854). Erpétologie générale ou histoire naturelle complète des reptiles. Tome septième. Deuxième partie. Comprenant l'histoire des serpents venimeux. (= General Herpetology or Complete Natural History of the Reptiles. Volume 7. Second Part. Containing the [Natural ] History of the Venomous Snakes). Paris: Roret. xii + pp. 781–1536. (Cerastes persicus, pp. 1443–1444). (in French).
Joger U (1984). The Venomous Snakes of the Near and Middle East. Wiesbaden: Dr. Ludwig Reichert Verlag. 175 pp.
Latifi M (1991). The Snakes of Iran. Second Edition. Oxford, Ohio: Deptartment of the Environment / Society for the Study of Amphibians and Reptiles. 156 pp. .
Marx H, Rabb GB (1965). "Relationships and Zoogeography of the Viperine Snakes (Family Viperidae)". Fieldiana Zool. 44 (21): 162-206.
Mendelssohn H (1965). "On the biology of venomous snakes of Israel. Part II". Israeli Journal of Zoology 14: 185-212.
Obst FJ (1983). "Zur Kenntnis der Schlangengattung Vipera. [= On Knowledge of the Snake Genus Vipera]". Zoolische Abhandlungen der staatliches Museum für Tierkunde in Dresden 38: 229-235. (in German).

External links
 

Viperinae
Snake genera
Taxa named by George Albert Boulenger